Glorit is a rural community in the Auckland Region of New Zealand's North Island. State Highway 16 runs through the area, connecting to Tauhoa 12 km to the north and Helensville to the south.

The settlement was established in 1868 and celebrated its 150th anniversary in 2018.

Two marae are located south of the main settlement: Araparera Marae or Te Aroha Pā and its Kia Mahara meeting house, and Kakanui Marae and Te Kia Ora meeting house. Both are tribal meeting grounds for Ngāti Rāngo, Ngāti Whātua and Ngāti Whātua o Kaipara.

Demographics
The SA1 area is part of the larger Kaipara Hills statistical area.

The SA1 statistical area had a population of 120 at the 2018 New Zealand census, an increase of 30 people (33.3%) since the 2013 census, and an increase of 60 people (100.0%) since the 2006 census. There were 36 households, comprising 66 males and 54 females, giving a sex ratio of 1.22 males per female. The median age was 34.5 years (compared with 37.4 years nationally), with 36 people (30.0%) aged under 15 years, 21 (17.5%) aged 15 to 29, 60 (50.0%) aged 30 to 64, and 6 (5.0%) aged 65 or older.

Ethnicities were 72.5% European/Pākehā, 45.0% Māori, 5.0% Pacific peoples, 2.5% Asian, and 2.5% other ethnicities. People may identify with more than one ethnicity.

Although some people chose not to answer the census's question about religious affiliation, 75.0% had no religion, 20.0% were Christian and 2.5% had Māori religious beliefs.

Of those at least 15 years old, 6 (7.1%) people had a bachelor's or higher degree, and 15 (17.9%) people had no formal qualifications. The median income was $32,400, compared with $31,800 nationally. 15 people (17.9%) earned over $70,000 compared to 17.2% nationally. The employment status of those at least 15 was that 51 (60.7%) people were employed full-time and 12 (14.3%) were part-time.

Notes

Rodney Local Board Area
Populated places in the Auckland Region
Populated places around the Kaipara Harbour